Yuito Obara (Japanese: 小原 唯和, born April 2, 2002) is a Japanese actor and fashion model. He was a finalist in the 28th Junon Superboy Contest.

Career 
He entered the world of entertainment after becoming a finalist in the Junon Super Boy Contest in 2015. He is also a fashion model in the fashion magazine nicola.

In 2017, he made his debut as an actor in the TV drama Anata no Koto ha Sorehodo as Mitsuru Arishima during middle school.

Obara has played the roles of Towa and Ryusoul Green in the Super Sentai series. In 2019, he played in the television dramas Super Sentai Strongest Battle as Ryusou Green and in Kishiryu Sentai Ryusoulger as Towa and Ryusou Green. The same year he played Towa and Ryusou Green in the movie Kishiryu Sentai Ryusoulger The Movie: Time Slip! Kyōryū Panic!!. In 2020, he played the same two roles in Kishiryu Sentai Ryusoulger VS Lupinranger VS Patranger, and in 2021 in Kishiryu Sentai Ryusoulger Special Chapter: Memory of Soulmates.

Filmography

Television dramas 
 Anata no Koto ha Sorehodo (2017, TBS) as Mitsuru Arishima
 Aishitatte Himitsu ha aru (2017, Nippon TV) as Rei Okumori
 AIBOU: Tokyo Detective Duo Ganjitsu Special (2018, TV Asahi) as Tomohiro Shiina
 Shitsuji Saionji no Meisuiri (2018, TV Tokyo) as Mizuki Yukimura
 Signal (2018, Kansai TV) as Yōichi Ogawa
 Super Sentai series
 Super Sentai Strongest Battle (2019, TV Asahi) as Ryusoul Green
 Kishiryu Sentai Ryusoulger (2019, TV Asahi) as Towa and Ryusoul Green
 Tokusō Nine (2020, TV Asahi) as Noboru Shikura

Internet dramas 
 &Bishōjo NEXT GIRL meets Tokyo (2017, FOD) as Kenta Miyazaki

Movies 
 Does the Flower Blossom? (2018, Toei) as Shōta Minagawa
 OVER DRIVE (2018, Toho) as the protagonist Atsuhiro Hiyama
 Aiuta -Yakusoku no Nakuhito- (2019, Toei)
 Super Sentai series (Toei) as Towa and Ryusoul Green
 Kishiryu Sentai Ryusoulger The Movie: Time Slip! Kyōryū Panic!! (2019)
 Kishiryu Sentai Ryusoulger VS Lupinranger VS Patranger (2020)
 Kishiryu Sentai Ryusoulger Special Chapter: Memory of Soulmates (2021)

References 

Japanese male television actors
Japanese male film actors
Japanese male child actors
Japanese male models
2002 births
Living people
21st-century Japanese male actors